Matyáš Bělohradský (born 7 June 2001) is a retired Czech figure skater. He is a two-time Czech national champion (2019, 2022).

Personal life 
Matyáš Bělohradský was born on 7 June 2001 in Planá, Czech Republic. He is the younger brother of Czech figure skater Jiří Bělohradský.

Career

Early career 
Bělohradský began learning to skate in 2007. He competed on the advanced novice level from April 2013 to February 2014. His junior international debut came in September 2014 at the ISU Junior Grand Prix in the Czech Republic. At the time, he was coached by Monika Škorničková in Mariánské Lázně.

2016–2017 season 
In September 2016, Bělohradský won bronze at the 2016 Cup of Mordovia in Saransk, Russia. In December, he finished fourth, competing in the senior ranks at the 2017 Four National Championships in Katowice, Poland. He won his first senior national medal, silver, having finished second to his brother, Jiří Bělohradský. Vlasta Kopřivová and Tomáš Verner coached him in Prague.

2017–2018 season 
Making his senior international debut, Bělohradský finished 12th at the 2017 CS Minsk-Arena Ice Star in October. In December, he placed third at the 2018 Four National Championships in Košice (Slovakia), having ranked sixth in the short program and first in the free skate. He repeated as national silver medalist, again finishing second to his brother.

2018–2019 season 
Bělohradský appeared at two Junior Grand Prix events and then placed sixth in the senior ranks at the 2018 CS Tallinn Trophy. In December 2018, he finished first – 25.69 points ahead of second-placed Petr Kotlařík – at the Four National Championships in Budapest, Hungary. It was his first senior national title. He was named in the Czech team to the 2019 European Championships in Minsk, Belarus.

2021–2022 season 
Bělohradský began the season at the 2021 CS Lombardia Trophy, where he placed seventeenth. At this second Challenger event, the 2021 CS Finlandia Trophy, he finished sixteenth and was later fifteenth at the 2021 CS Cup of Austria. He was twenty-seventh at the 2022 European Championships, failing to qualify for the free skate.

Programs

Competitive highlights 
CS: Challenger Series; JGP: Junior Grand Prix

References

External links 
 

2001 births
Czech male single skaters
Living people
People from Planá
Sportspeople from the Plzeň Region